Károly Vántus (20 February 1879 – 16 June 1927) was a Hungarian politician and carpenter, who served as People's Commissar of Agriculture during the Hungarian Soviet Republic. He was a founding member of the Communist Party of Hungary. He died in the Soviet Union.

References
 Magyar Életrajzi Lexikon

1879 births
1927 deaths
People from Oradea
People from the Kingdom of Hungary
Hungarian Calvinist and Reformed Christians
Social Democratic Party of Hungary politicians
Hungarian Communist Party politicians
Agriculture ministers of Hungary
Hungarian expatriates in the Soviet Union

Burials at Novodevichy Cemetery